Davis Reef is a coral reef located within the Florida Keys National Marine Sanctuary. It lies to the southeast of Plantation Key.  This reef lies within a Sanctuary Preservation Area (SPA).

The southern end of the reef is sometimes called "Davis Ledge."

Davis reef lies between Crocker Reef and Conch Reef.

The Fish and Wildlife Research Institute (FWRI, the research arm of the Florida Fish and Wildlife Conservation Commission), the Florida Keys National Marine Sanctuary, the Coral Restoration Foundation (CRF), the Wildlife Foundation of Florida (WFF), and the family of the late Charlie Stroh have recently begun a program of "outplanting" corals around Davis reef.

External links
 Barbara H. Lidz, Christopher D. Reich, and Eugene A. Shinn.  Systematic Mapping of Bedrock and Habitats along the Florida Reef Tract—Central Key Largo to Halfmoon Shoal (Gulf of Mexico).  USGS Professional Paper 1751 Tile 2, Davis and Alligator Reefs
 Benthic Habitat Map

References

 NOAA National Marine Sanctuary Maps, Florida Keys East
 NOAA website on Davis Reef
 NOAA Navigational Chart 11464

Coral reefs of the Florida Keys